α-Pinene is an organic compound of the terpene class, one of two isomers of pinene.  It is an alkene and it contains a reactive four-membered ring.  It is found in the oils of many species of many coniferous trees, notably the pine.  It is also found in the essential oil of rosemary (Rosmarinus officinalis) and Satureja myrtifolia (also known as Zoufa in some regions).  Both enantiomers are known in nature; (1S,5S)- or (−)-α-pinene is more common in European pines, whereas the (1R,5R)- or (+)-α-isomer is more common in North America.  The racemic mixture is present in some oils such as eucalyptus oil and orange peel oil.

Reactivity 

Commercially important derivatives of alpha-pinene are linalool, geraniol, nerol, a-terpineol, and camphene.

α-Pinene 1 is reactive owing to the presence of the four-membered ring adjacent to the alkene. The compound is prone to skeletal rearrangements such as the Wagner–Meerwein rearrangement.  Acids typically lead to rearranged products. With concentrated sulfuric acid and ethanol the major products are terpineol 2 and its ethyl ether 3, while glacial acetic acid gives the corresponding acetate 4. With dilute acids, terpin hydrate 5 becomes the major product.

With one molar equivalent of anhydrous HCl, the simple addition product 6a can be formed at low temperature in the presence of diethyl ether, but it is very unstable.  At normal temperatures, or if no ether is present, the major product is bornyl chloride 6b, along with a small amount of fenchyl chloride 6c.  For many years 6b (also called "artificial camphor") was referred to as "pinene hydrochloride", until it was confirmed as identical with bornyl chloride made from camphene.  If more HCl is used, achiral 7 (dipentene hydrochloride) is the major product along with some 6b.  Nitrosyl chloride followed by base leads to the oxime 8 which can be reduced to "pinylamine" 9.  Both 8 and 9 are stable compounds containing an intact four-membered ring, and these compounds helped greatly in identifying this important component of the pinene skeleton.

Under aerobic oxidation conditions, the main oxidation products are pinene oxide, verbenyl hydroperoxide, verbenol and verbenone.

Atmospheric role 
Monoterpenes, of which α-pinene is one of the principal species, are emitted in substantial amounts by vegetation, and these emissions are affected by temperature and light intensity. In the atmosphere α-pinene undergoes reactions with ozone, the hydroxyl radical or the NO3 radical, leading to low-volatility species which partly condense on existing aerosols, thereby generating secondary organic aerosols. This has been shown in numerous laboratory experiments for the mono- and sesquiterpenes. Products of α-pinene which have been identified explicitly are pinonaldehyde, norpinonaldehyde, pinic acid, pinonic acid and pinalic acid.

Properties and usage
α-Pinene is highly bioavailable with 60% human pulmonary uptake with rapid metabolism or redistribution. α-Pinene is an anti-inflammatory via PGE1, and is likely antimicrobial. It exhibits activity as an acetylcholinesterase inhibitor, aiding memory. Like borneol, verbenol and pinocarveol (−)-α-pinene is a positive modulator of GABAA receptors. It acts at the benzodiazepine binding site.

α-Pinene forms the biosynthetic base for CB2 ligands, such as HU-308.

α-Pinene is one of the many terpenes and terpenoids found in cannabis plants. These compounds are also present in significant levels in the finished, dried cannabis flower preparation commonly known as marijuana. It is widely theorized by scientists and cannabis experts alike that these terpenes and terpenoids contribute significantly to the unique "character" or "personality" of each marijuana strain's unique effects. α-Pinene in particular is thought to reduce the memory deficits commonly reported as a side-effect of THC consumption. It likely demonstrates this activity due to its action as an acetylcholinesterase inhibitor, a class of compounds which are known to aid memory and increase alertness.

α-Pinene also contributes significantly to many of the varied, distinct, and unique odor profiles of the multitude of marijuana strains, varieties and cultivars.

References 

Acetylcholinesterase inhibitors
Antibiotics
Flavors
Cycloalkenes
GABAA receptor positive allosteric modulators
Monoterpenes
Cyclobutanes
Plant communication